Edmundo Gregorio Valencia Monterrubio (born 18 November 1946) is a Mexican politician affiliated with the National Action Party. He served as Deputy of the LIX Legislature of the Mexican Congress as a plurinominal representative. He also served as municipal president of Atotonilco El Grande.

References

1946 births
Living people
Politicians from Hidalgo (state)
Members of the Chamber of Deputies (Mexico)
National Action Party (Mexico) politicians
Municipal presidents in Hidalgo (state)
Universidad del Valle de México alumni
Universidad Autónoma del Estado de Hidalgo alumni
20th-century Mexican politicians
21st-century Mexican politicians
Deputies of the LIX Legislature of Mexico